TekWar: TekLords is a 1994 TV movie, based on a series of books by William Shatner. It is the second TV movie made from the series of books.  It aired on 20 February 1994 and is preceded by TekWar (23 January 1994). It precedes TekWar: TekLab (27 February 1994) and TekWar: TekJustice (14 May 1994).

Plot 
Drug lords take over the empire left by convicted Sonny Hokori.

Cast

See also
 TekWar (TV series)

External links

1994 television films
1994 films
Television shows based on American novels
American science fiction television films
Canadian science fiction television films
Action Pack (TV programming block)
Films directed by George Bloomfield
1990s American films
1990s Canadian films